Eddie Locke Jr. (January 13, 1923 – March 2, 1992) was an American Negro league outfielder between 1943 and 1950.

A native of Gatesville, Texas, Locke made his Negro leagues debut in 1943 with the Cincinnati Clowns and the Kansas City Monarchs. He went on to play several seasons with the Monarchs, and also played for the New York Black Yankees. Locke played minor league baseball in the 1950s, including stints with the Springfield Giants and Vancouver Capilanos, and three seasons with the Amarillo Gold Sox. He died in Corpus Christi, Texas in 1992 at age 69.

References

External links
 and Seamheads

1923 births
1992 deaths
Cincinnati Clowns players
Kansas City Monarchs players
New York Black Yankees players
Baseball outfielders
Baseball players from Texas
People from Gatesville, Texas
20th-century African-American sportspeople
American expatriate baseball players in Nicaragua